is a Japanese football player.

National team career
In August 2007, Kanai was elected Japan U-17 national team for 2007 U-17 World Cup. He played full time in all 3 matches as center back.

Club statistics
Updated to 21 February 2019.

1Includes Emperor's Cup.
2Includes J. League Cup.

Awards and honours

Japan
AFC U-17 Championship (1) : 2006

References

External links
Profile at Yokohama F. Marinos 

1990 births
Living people
Association football people from Kanagawa Prefecture
Japanese footballers
Japan youth international footballers
J1 League players
J2 League players
Yokohama F. Marinos players
Sagan Tosu players
JEF United Chiba players
Nagoya Grampus players
Shimizu S-Pulse players
Ventforet Kofu players
FC Ryukyu players
Association football defenders